The cinereous tyrant (Knipolegus striaticeps) is a species of bird in the family Tyrannidae. The term cinereous describes its colouration. It inhabits the Gran Chaco, where Its natural habitat is subtropical or tropical dry shrubland.

References

cinereous tyrant
Birds of the Gran Chaco
cinereous tyrant
Taxonomy articles created by Polbot